Way House may refer to:

James W. and Mary Way House, Kirkwood, MO, listed on the NRHP in Missouri
Killicut-Way House, Nashua, NH, listed on the NRHP in New Hampshire
Dr. J. Howell Way House, Waynesville, NC, listed on the NRHP in North Carolina
Way House (Wagoner, Oklahoma), listed on the NRHP in Oklahoma
Nicholas Way House, Pittsburgh, PA, listed on the NRHP in Pennsylvania

See also
Halfway House (disambiguation)